The Sanremo Music Festival 1965 was the 15th annual Sanremo Music Festival, held at the Sanremo Casino in Sanremo, province of Imperia between 28 and 30 January 1965.

The show was presented by Mike Bongiorno, assisted by Grazia Maria Spina. Gianni Ravera served as artistic director.
  
According to the rules of this edition every song was performed in a double performance by a couple of singers or groups. The winners of the Festival were  Bobby Solo and The New Christy Minstrels with the song "Se piangi, se ridi".

Participants and results

References 

Sanremo Music Festival by year
1965 in Italian music
1965 in music
1965 music festivals